The Shop Clubs Act 1902 (2 Edw. 7 c. 21) was an Act of Parliament of the Parliament of the United Kingdom, given the royal assent on 8 August 1902, and repealed in 1986.

It was made illegal for an employer to require a worker to resign his membership in a friendly society as a condition of employment, or to prohibit him from joining a friendly society other than the workplace shop club or thrift fund.

The Act did allow for compulsory membership of a shop club or thrift fund, provided it was registered under the Friendly Societies Act 1896 and certified under this Act. The certification was conditional on the Registrar of Friendly Societies determining that it offered significant benefits to the employee, that it took contributions at the cost of the employer as well as its members, and that it was of a permanent character. The Registrar was also to consult with the workforce, and no such society was to be established unless at least three-quarters of the employees desired it. A schedule provided guidelines for the regulations of any certified societies.

No member was to be forced to resign his membership on account of having left employment; he was to be given the option of remaining a member or having an appropriate share of the funds returned to him.

The Act came into force on 1 January 1903 and was repealed by the Wages Act 1986.

References
The Public General Acts Passed in the Second Year of the Reign of His Majesty King Edward the Seventh. London: printed for His Majesty's Stationery Office. 1902.
Chronological table of the statutes; HMSO, London. 1993.

United Kingdom Acts of Parliament 1902
Repealed United Kingdom Acts of Parliament